Overbrook, Pennsylvania may refer to:

Overbrook (Pittsburgh)
Overbrook, Philadelphia